Shang Xiaoyun (1900 – April 19, 1976) was one of the four great twentieth century performers of the Dan role type in Peking opera with Mei Lanfang, Cheng Yanqiu, and Xun Huisheng. All four were male actors who specialized in impersonating women.

In addition to his singing, Shang was known for his dance and acrobatic skills. He was the founder of the Rong Chun Opera School.

References 

1900 births
1976 deaths
Chinese male Peking opera actors
Chinese male dancers
Victims of the Cultural Revolution
20th-century Chinese  male singers
Female impersonators in Peking opera
People from Nangong
Singers from Hebei
Male actors from Hebei
20th-century Chinese male actors
Burials at Babaoshan Revolutionary Cemetery